Armed forces of the People's Republic of China may refer to its three constituents:
 People's Liberation Army, the regular armed forces of the People's Republic of China (PRC) and of the Chinese Communist Party (CCP)
 People's Armed Police, the Chinese paramilitary police, including China Coast Guard
 Militia of China, the militia part of the armed forces of the People's Republic of China

See also
 Armed Forces of China